Kentucky Route 426 (KY 426) is a  state highway in the U.S. state of Kentucky. The highway travels through rural areas of Marion County.

Route description
KY 426 begins at an intersection with KY 84 (Raywick Road) south-southwest of St. Mary, within the central part of Marion County. It travels to the east-southeast and curves to the southeast before meeting its eastern terminus, an intersection with U.S. Route 68 (US 68) and KY 55 (Jane Todd Crawford Trail / Campbellsville Road). Here, the roadway continues as Mullins Lane.

Major intersections

See also

References

0426
Transportation in Marion County, Kentucky